On May 23, 2013, at approximately 7:00 pm PDT, a span of the bridge carrying Interstate 5 over the Skagit River in the U.S. state of Washington collapsed. Three people in two different vehicles fell into the river below and were rescued by boat, escaping serious injury. The cause of the catastrophic failure was determined to be an oversize load striking several of the bridge's overhead support beams, leading to an immediate collapse of the northernmost span.

The through-truss bridge was built in 1955 and connects the Skagit County cities of Mount Vernon and Burlington, providing a vital link between Vancouver, British Columbia and Seattle. It consists of four consecutive spans that are structurally independent. Only the northernmost span collapsed into the river; the adjacent span also sustained impact damage from the same vehicle, but not severe enough to result in a collapse. The overhead support structure was known to have been struck by a truck as recently as October 2012.

Not long before the accident, the bridge had been evaluated as safe. Although not structurally deficient, it was considered "functionally obsolete", meaning it did not meet current design standards. The bridge's design was "fracture-critical," meaning that it did not have redundant structural members to protect its structural integrity in the event of a failure of one of the bridge's support members.

Within a month of the collapse, two temporary bridges were erected and placed on the failed span's support columns while the permanent bridge was built. In September 2013, the permanent bridges were installed and work began to prevent similar failures of the remaining three spans.

Background

I-5 is the primary highway between the metropolitan areas of Seattle and Vancouver, British Columbia. Before the collapse, approximately 71,000 vehicles crossed the bridge every day.

The bridge was built in 1955, as part of the state government's upgrades to the U.S. Route 99 corridor and a year before the Interstate Highway System was begun. The bridge carries four lanes of traffic, two lanes in each direction separated by a median barrier. The spans are built from triangulated steel girders, using a through-truss design where the roadway passes in an open tunnel between the left and right trusses and between the lower and upper truss work. The roadway has relatively limited vertical clearance for tall vehicles due to the upper truss members. The abutted spans share pier footings and appear to be one continuous bridge, but the four spans are actually independent.

The bridge had been recently evaluated as safe and in good condition despite being 58 years old; it was not listed as structurally deficient. The bridge was classified as functionally obsolete, in this case because the bridge does not meet current design standards for lane widths and vertical clearance in new highway bridges. The bridge was not a candidate for any significant upgrades or replacement and was well-maintained.

Through-truss design

This steel through-truss bridge had a "fracture-critical" design with non-redundant load-bearing beams and joints that were each essential to the whole structure staying intact. An initial failure (perhaps by cracking) of a single essential part can sometimes overload other parts and make them fail, which quickly triggers a chain reaction of even more failures and causes the entire bridge span to collapse. In 2007 the I-35W Mississippi River bridge in Minneapolis collapsed suddenly from slow cracking of a single undersized and over-stressed gusset plate. In steel, these initial fractures begin small and take years to grow large enough to become dangerous. Following the Minneapolis incident, such age-related disasters in fracture-critical bridges are now avoided by finding and repairing cracks in a required thorough inspection every two years. Eighteen thousand bridges in the United States are labelled fracture-critical (from their design) and require crack inspections.  The Skagit River bridge had last been inspected for cracks in August and November 2012 with only minor work needed.

Besides fracturing, some bridges with critical non-redundant parts can also suddenly fail from buckling of compressive members (the opposite of cracking of tensile members). In through-truss bridges the critical compressive parts are the top-chord beams running horizontally along the top of the bridge, parallel to the roadway edges. They carry most of the weight of the bridge and traffic. The chords are normally kept aligned and held in place by vertical posts, diagonals, and sideways sway struts. Top chords will quickly fold if their joints somehow become misaligned. Buckling damage is cumulative, but mostly happens from collision damage or overstresses rather than from age and corrosion.

The vertical clearance for vehicles is limited by the portals and sideways sway struts. These are relatively low in older bridges. In Washington State bridges, the sway struts are often curved downwards at the outer ends, with less clearance above the outer lanes and outer shoulders. Tall loads then need to use the inner lanes for maximal clearance. These bridges are vulnerable to impacts by overheight vehicles, and such impacts were common. There was a known strike on this bridge that occurred on October 22, 2012, and investigators found evidence of several other impacts in years past. Bridge inspection reports dating back to 1979 frequently note damage caused by over-height vehicles, and an inspection report from late 2012 noted a three-inch gash in the steel.

According to Charles Roeder, a professor of civil engineering at the University of Washington in Seattle, through-truss bridges were a common bridge design in the 1950s (there are 10,200 through-truss bridges in the US), but "[i]f you take out some of the top framing, you set that bridge up for a stability failure."  Before computers, bridge engineers analyzed truss forces by slide rule, with each calculation being time-consuming. Although the finite element method and plastic design theory, both capable of analyzing redundant structures, had recently been formulated and had seen occasional use, they required significantly more calculation than the simple calculation methods for statically determinate structures, which precluded the use of redundant structural members. A great number of bridges were being designed at that time, and there were insufficient design engineers available to design many bridges as indeterminate structures.

Nowadays, through-truss and other fracture-critical designs are avoided in most new bridges for moderate-sized spans. Using three or more parallel main beams or trusses allows the structure to survive a single component failure.

Incident

The collapse was caused by a southbound semi-trailer truck from Canada hauling an oversize load to Vancouver, Washington, directly damaging sway struts and, indirectly, the compression chords in the overhead steel frame (trusswork) on the northernmost span of the bridge. The oversize truck instead entered the bridge in the outer lane, while a second semi-truck and a BMW were passing it in the inner lane. The National Transportation Safety Board (NTSB) measured the truck's height, after the crash, to be . A pilot car was hired to ensure the load could pass safely. The pilot car never signalled the truck driver that there would be a problem crossing the Skagit bridge and did not warn the trucker to use an inside lane.

The oversize truck completed crossing the bridge while the first span immediately collapsed behind it. Both the driver of the oversized load and the pilot vehicle remained at the scene and cooperated with investigators.

There were no fatalities, but three people were transported to local hospitals after being rescued from their fallen cars. The cars remained on the flooded bridge deck after it fell into the river.

The trucker, employed by Mullen Trucking, was hauling an oversize load containing a housing for drilling equipment. The company's vice-president, Ed Sherbinski, said permits had been issued from Washington State that included clearance for all bridge crossings on the route. The truck had been led over the bridge by a pilot escort vehicle. A spokesman for the Washington State Department of Transportation said there are no warning signs leading up to the bridge regarding its clearance height.

The oversize truck also damaged a sway strut of the second span, but not enough to initiate a collapse. That span was subsequently repaired.

Investigation

The Washington State Patrol and the National Transportation Safety Board investigated the accident. The NTSB's report attributes the collision to the tall-load truck being in the wrong, outside lane, and being crowded further into the shoulder by the passing truck. It attributes the bridge collapse to the collision taking out multiple sway braces, which destabilized the critical load-bearing (upper chord) members.

Lawsuits
Two of the three victims of the collapse filed a lawsuit against Mullen Trucking, the truck driver, the pilot car driver, and pilot car company. According to the suit, the negligence of the trucking and pilot car companies led to the collapse of the bridge. The Washington State Department of Transportation was not named in the suit as the victims and their attorney did not want to involve taxpayer money.

Response and replacement
Governor Jay Inslee declared an economic "state of emergency" for three surrounding counties (Skagit County, Snohomish County, and Whatcom County) in order to cope with disruption to traffic and the local economy.  Traffic on I-5 was detoured around the scene of the collapse on an adjacent bridge upstream.

The collapsed span was temporarily replaced by a pair of two-lane bridges manufactured by ACROW, which were rolled onto the existing bridge piers. It went into service on June 19. Inspections on the temporary span near the end of July 2013 uncovered that part of an "L" joint that holds the asphalt in place between the temporary bridge and permanent roadway had come loose. The right lane of the bridge was closed for about two hours while crews welded the joint back into place and spread new asphalt.

A $6.87 million contract was awarded to contractor Max J. Kuney Construction of Spokane to design and build a permanent replacement span. It was built alongside the temporary span without interrupting traffic, and moved into place during an overnight closure on September 14–15, 2013. Later, changes were made to the three remaining overhead spans that allowed overheight vehicles to operate in the outer lanes.

The collapse raised questions about how Washington State Department of Transportation regulates oversize vehicles. The department leaves it up to drivers to determine a safe route to their destination, unlike in many other states where routes are assigned. The permit for Mullen Trucking's trip did not specifically note the Skagit River Bridge as a hazard on the route, even though the outer trusses were a full foot lower than the truck; this contrasts with an earlier permit to the same company that included numerous clearance warnings. State lawmakers are exploring making changes to the state's oversize vehicle laws.

The bridge constructed to replace the collapsed bridge has been named the Trooper Sean M. O'Connell Jr. Memorial Bridge. State trooper Sean O'Connell was killed while directing traffic through the detour when his motorcycle hit a truck. Shortly after the accident, three state lawmakers proposed a bill that would rename the repaired bridge after him; this change was approved by the Washington State Transportation Commission.

Washington's infrastructure
Prior to the bridge collapse the Seattle Section of the American Society of Civil Engineers (ASCE) issued the 2013 Report Card for the State of Washington's infrastructure. The state's bridges were given a grade of "C−" (an average score among states). There were 400 structurally deficient bridges in Washington. Thirty-six percent of all bridges are more than 50 years old. The oldest bridges were designed for an expected life of only 50 years; keeping them safe is increasingly difficult and expensive. The advocacy group Transportation for America reports that 5.1% of Washington's bridges are structurally deficient, which is the sixth best in the country.

See also
 List of bridge failures

References

External links

, Washington State Department of Transportation
 
 

2013 disasters in the United States
2013 in Washington (state)
2013 industrial disasters
Bridge disasters caused by collision
Bridge disasters in the United States
Bridges in Washington (state)
History of Skagit County, Washington
Interstate 5
May 2013 events in the United States
Steel bridges in the United States
Transportation disasters in Washington (state)